The Concerto per Trombone e Orchestra in C was composed by Italian composer Nino Rota in 1966. The concerto is in three movements:
Allegro giusto
Lento, ben ritmato
Allegro moderato

This concerto was given its premiere performance on March 6, 1969, at the Conservatorio di Musica "Giuseppe Verdi" in Milano, Italy, by trombonist Bruno Ferrari (to whom the work is dedicated), with the Orchestra I Pomeriggi Musicali conducted by Franco Caracciolo.

This piece is considered one of the important trombone concertos in the classical repertoire.  A performance of the concerto usually lasts around 13 minutes.

Instrumentation
This score is written for solo trombone and orchestra, with the following instrumentation:
 Woodwinds
 1 flute
 1 oboe
 2 clarinets in B
 2 bassoons
 Brass
 2 horns in F
 Percussion
 timpani
 Strings
 1st violins
 2nd violins
 violas
 cellos
 double basses

Recordings

with orchestra 
 1988 International Competition for Musical Performers, Geneva (Musica Helvetica MH 72.2) - 1989
 Jonas Bylund, trombone; Orchestre de la Suisse Romande; Joaquin da Silva Pereira, conductor.
 All The Lonely People (BIS-CD-568) - 1993
 Christian Lindberg, trombone; Tapiola Sinfonietta; Osmo Vänskä, conductor.
 Deutscher Musikwettbewerb - 2007 Award Winner (Genuin Classics GEN 11188) - 2011
 Frederic Belli, trombone; SWR Sinfonieorchester Baden-Baden und Freiburg; Pablo Heras-Casado, conductor.
 Nino Rota: Concertos (Chandos CHAN 9954) - 2002
 Andrea Conti, trombone; I Virtuosi Italiani; Marzio Conti, conductor.
 Nino Rota: Orchestral Works, Vol. 2 (Decca 4810394) - 2013
 Giuliano Rizzotto, trombone; Orchestra Sinfonica di Milano Giuseppe Verdi; Giuseppe Grazioli, conductor.
 Nino Rota: La Strada; Concertos (ATMA Classique ACD22294) - 2003
 Alain Trudel, trombone; Orchestre Métropolitain du Grand Montréal, Yannick Nézet-Séguin, conductor.
 Trombone Concertos (Claves CD 9606) - 1996
 Branimir Slokar, trombone; Berliner Symphoniker; Lior Shambadal, conductor.

with piano reduction 
 Colors (Octavia Records Cryston OVCC-00137) - 2017
 Kyoichiro Kori, trombone; Atsuko Kaminaga, piano.

References

External links 
 Discography of Classical Trombone CDs

Compositions by Nino Rota
Rota, Nino
1966 compositions